Volodymyr Fedorovych Muntyan, (born 14 September 1946, Kotovsk, USSR) is a Soviet and Ukrainian midfielder of the 1960s and 1970s. Muntyan is considered to be one of the best and most talented players to ever represent Dynamo Kyiv and Soviet Union. He is also the only player apart from Oleg Blokhin (his teammate in the 1970s) who has won 7 Soviet championships. His brother Viktor Muntyan is also a former professional football player.

Biography

Early years
A son of an ethnic Romanian factory worker and a Ukrainian nurse, Muntyan became interested in acrobatics and competed successfully in Kyiv's citywide competition, winning accolades in his age category. His family eventually relocated to live near a professional soccer grounds in Kyiv, where young Muntyan and his friends would hang out, acting as ball boys to the elders. While once juggling a ball, he was approached by a soldier, who asked him if he was interested in taking up football as a sport. Muntyan said yes and was taken to Mikhail Korsunsky, who was a famous local children's coach at the time. He quickly recognised Muntyan's potential.

Youth years
Due to the boy's natural talent, he was included in Kyiv's youth team with people like Semen Altman and Anatoly Byshovets (both coaches now). After a Spartakiada match between the Kyiv and Moscow teams, which Kyiv won, Dynamo Kyiv youth coach Mykhaylo Koman offered young Muntyan to come to a training session with the senior team the next day at 11:00. The young boy turned up outside the ground, but was so scared to see his idols Valery Lobanovsky, Andriy Biba, that he hid behind a tree and didn't make the team bus. However his friend Anatoly Byshovets helped him to get over the fear and eventually he turned up to a training session.

Early career
Muntyan joined the Dynamo Kyiv team as a 15-year-old, when the main team coach was Victor Maslov. Despite weighing only 60 kg (9.5 stones) and being only 170 cm in height, he was encouraged to play and his skills were further enhanced by the training. When five of then current squad left to join 1966 Soviet football team for the World Cup, Dynamo Kyiv managed to win a double (championship and the cup) with Muntyan stepping in from the reserves as one of the main players.

Statistics for Dynamo

The statistics in USSR Cups and Europe is made under the scheme "autumn-spring" and enlisted in a year of start of tournaments

Honours
Ukrainian Footballer of the Year: 
 1970

Soviet Footballer of the Year: 
 1969

USSR Championship: 7 (record) Winner
 1966, 1967, 1968, 1971, 1974, 1975, 1977

USSR Cup: Winner
 1966, 1974,

UEFA Cup Winners Cup: Winner
 1975

UEFA Super Cup: Winner
 1975

UEFA Euro 1968: Fourth Place 
 1968

UEFA Euro 1972: Runner-up
 1972

USSR Championship: Runner-up
 1965, 1969, 1972, 1973, 1976

USSR Cup: Runner-up
 1973

USSR Super Cup: Runner-up
 1977

Ballon d'Or

1969 – 23rd

References

External links 
 RussiaTeam Biography 
 

1946 births
Living people
Soviet footballers
Soviet football managers
Soviet expatriate football managers
Ukrainian people of Romanian descent
Ukrainian footballers
Soviet Top League players
FC Dynamo Kyiv players
FC CSKA Kyiv players
UEFA Euro 1968 players
1970 FIFA World Cup players
UEFA Euro 1972 players
Soviet Union international footballers
Ukrainian football managers
Ukrainian expatriate football managers
FC CSKA Kyiv managers
Ukraine national football team managers
Ukraine national under-21 football team managers
FC Mariupol managers
Expatriate football managers in Madagascar
Expatriate football managers in Guinea
Guinea national football team managers
FC Dnipro Cherkasy managers
SC Tavriya Simferopol managers
FC Obolon Kyiv managers
FC Spartak Vladikavkaz managers
Russian Premier League managers
Expatriate football managers in Russia
FC Kryvbas Kryvyi Rih managers
FC Vorskla Poltava managers
Ukrainian Premier League managers
Ukrainian expatriate sportspeople in Russia
Soviet people of Romanian descent
1998 African Cup of Nations managers
Association football midfielders
Sportspeople from Odesa Oblast